Antonio de la Torre Martín (born 18 January 1968) is a Spanish actor.

De la Torre is the actor with most nominations overall to the Goya Awards. He won the Goya Award for Best Supporting Actor for Dark Blue Almost Black in 2007, whereas he earned the Goya Award for Best Actor for The Realm in 2019. He has starred in many films directed by Daniel Sánchez Arévalo, with whom he collaborated for the first time in the short film Profilaxis (2003).

Biography 
Antonio de la Torre Martín was born on 18 January 1968 in Málaga. After earning a licentiate degree in Journalism, he worked work for a time as a sports journalist for Andalusian regional broadcaster Canal Sur.
He trained his acting chops under Cristina Rota in Madrid. He landed afterwards minor film roles in The Worst Years of Our Lives (1994, his feature film debut), You Shall Die in Chafarinas, The Day of the Beast, Hola, ¿estás sola? and Not Love, Just Frenzy. He has since developed a long career in cinema.

Selected filmography

Accolades

References

External links 

 

1968 births
Living people
Spanish male film actors
People from Málaga
Best Supporting Actor Goya Award winners
20th-century Spanish male actors
21st-century Spanish male actors
Male actors from Andalusia